Balter/Saunier is a 2016 album of a collaboration between orchestral Ensemble Dal Niente, composer Marcos Balter, and experimental rock band Deerhoof. The Boston Globe described the album as "arrestingly gorgeous".

Track listing

References

External links 

 

2016 albums
Deerhoof albums